Soup to Nuts is a 1930 American pre-Code comedy film written by cartoonist, sculptor, author, and inventor  Rube Goldberg and directed by Benjamin Stoloff. It was the film debut of the original four members who would later, minus Ted Healy, go on to become known as The Three Stooges comic trio (Shemp Howard, Moe Howard, and Larry Fine). Goldberg made a cameo appearance in the film as himself, opening letters in a restaurant. Several other comedians are also featured.

Plot
Ted Healy is a salesman for the Schmidt Costume Shop who likes to hang out at the fire station where Moe (billed as "Harry Howard"), Larry, and Shemp (along with Fred Sanborn) work. Old man Schmidt spends more time building crazy inventions (typical of devices by writer/cartoonist Rube Goldberg) than tending to his business; as a consequence he is bankrupt and his business is taken over by his creditors, who send a young man named Carlson to manage the business. Carlson immediately falls for Schmidt's niece, Louise, but she resists him.

Meanwhile, a certain General Avocado wants to organize a revolution in San Stevedore and comes to the costume shop to order uniforms; sadly his army flees in fright without paying at the sound of a child bursting a toy balloon. Ted also swings a deal with the Fire Department to supply costumes for the fireman's ball. Carlson wants to take Louise, so Ted hatches a plan to take Louise, and have himself and Carlson dressed alike, then switch places at the ball. When Louise learns of the switch, she runs back to the shop and locks herself in her room. Carlson chases her home, and unknowingly starts a fire while trying to persuade her to come out. The firemen (the Stooges) arrive to extinguish the blaze — with the unexpected help of one of Old Man Schmidt's inventions — and at last Louise and Carlson are a couple.

Cast
Ted Healy as Ted
Frances McCoy as Queenie
Stanley Smith as Richard Carlson
Lucile Browne as Louise
Charles Winninger as Otto Schmidt
Hallam Cooley as D. Quincy Throckmorton
George Bickel as Gus Klein
Shemp Howard as Fireman
Larry Fine as Fireman
Moe Howard (credited as Harry Howard) as Fireman
William H. Tooker as Ferguson
Fred Sanborn as Mute Fireman
Billy Barty as Junior (uncredited)
Rube Goldberg as himself (uncredited and cameo)
Heinie Conklin as Fireman playing checkers (uncredited)
Billy Bletcher as Revolutionary (uncredited)
Bobby Barber as Revolutionary (uncredited)
Jimmy Aubrey as Revolutionary (uncredited)

The Three Stooges appearance
This film was released before Shemp, Moe & Larry first broke out on their own and toured as "Howard, Fine & Howard: Three Lost Soles" from Fall 1930 to mid-1932.  They rejoined Healy in July 1932 for the Broadway revue PASSING SHOW OF 1932, but Healy quit during rehearsals, which subsequently prompted Shemp Howard to leave on August 19, 1932 (he remained with PASSING for a time, and then began a solo career, landing at Brooklyn's Vitaphone Studios in May 1933).  Younger Howard brother Jerry (Curly) replaced Shemp on August 20, 1932, and Ted Healy's stooges became Moe, Larry & Curly.  The Stooges finally split from Healy in March 1934, and became The Three Stooges at Columbia Studios.  (When Curly was debilitated by strokes years later, Shemp reluctantly abandoned his solo career and returned to the Stooges). In Soup to Nuts, Shemp appears to be the "leader" of the three. He has most of the dialogue and does a lot of the pushing and hitting. Plus, Shemp was billed before the other two in the credits. Also note that Moe was credited as "Harry Howard."

In the film, the Stooges use one of their longest running gags. This same gag was used not only in many of their short films but also in their final feature film Kook's Tour.
 "Is there gas in the tank?"
 "The arrow points half way. I don't know if it's half empty or half full."

This is the first film where the Stooges sing a cappella style: "You'll Never Know What Tears Are" as well as the only time they sang it in a film with Shemp.

Heinie Conklin portrays one of the firemen. Conklin later made appearances in the Stooges' films at Columbia Pictures.

See also
The Three Stooges filmography

External links

Profile

1930 films
American black-and-white films
1930s English-language films
Films about firefighting
Films directed by Benjamin Stoloff
Fox Film films
The Three Stooges films
American musical comedy films
1930 musical comedy films
1930 romantic comedy films
American romantic comedy films
American romantic musical films
1930s romantic musical films
1930 lost films
1930s American films
Silent romantic comedy films